Nasikabatrachus bhupathi, or Bhupathy's purple frog, is a frog species belonging to the family Nasikabatrachidae. It can be found in the Western Ghats in India and was discovered near the Srivilliputhur Grizzled Giant Squirrel Wildlife Sanctuary. The specific epithet honors the late Indian herpetologist Subramanian Bhupathy (1963–2014).

Taxonomy
Nasikabatrachus bhupathi and Nasikabatrachus sahyadrensis have been found to be related to other frogs that live in the Seychelles, which are closer to Africa than to India.  This is consistent with the idea that Africa and India were once part of the same ancient supercontinent, called Gondwanaland, which eventually became part of the later supercontinent, .

Description
The species has purple skin and blue eyes and lives underground.  It differs genetically, morphologically, and acoustically from the closely related Nasikabatrachus sahyadrensis.  Speciation between the two species is likely caused by the different monsoon seasons on the different sides of the Western Ghats, causing N. sahyadrensis to breed between May and August and  N. bhupathi to breed between October and December.

Status 
This species is considered Critically Endangered on the IUCN Red List due to its very small range, which is mostly threatened by water extraction, pollution, and disturbance from tourism.

References

External links
Continental drift and the Sooglossidae
Nasikabatrachus bhupathi on ZooBank

Nasikabatrachidae
Frogs of India
Endemic fauna of the Western Ghats
Amphibians described in 2017
Taxa named by Ramesh K. Aggarwal
Taxa named by Karthikeyan Vasudevan